Padilla de Abajo is a small village and municipality located in the province of Burgos, in the kingdom of Spain. It has a romanic chapel that hosts a figure of the Virgin Mary called Nuestra Señora del Torreon. Many of its inhabitants still have "Padilla" as their family name.

References

Municipalities in the Province of Burgos